The following is an incomplete list of agents who served in the field for the Special Operations Executive during World War II.

A

B

C

D

E 

Francois Michelle William Reeve

F

G

H

I

J

K

L

M

N

O

P

Q

R

S

T

U

V

W

Y

Z

Key

See also
 List of female SOE agents
 SOE F Section networks
 Timeline of SOE's Prosper Network

References

British people of World War II
 
World War II-related lists
Ministry of Economic Warfare